Jean-Louis Ravelomanantsoa (30 March 1943 – 27 September 2016) was a Malagasy athlete who specialized in the 100 metres.

At the 1964 Summer Olympics he was eliminated in the heats in both 100 and 200 metres.

At the 1968 Summer Olympics he was again eliminated in the heats of the 200 m, but reached the 100 metres final and placed eighth. At these Games he also set his career best time of 10.18 seconds in a tail wind of 2.0 m/s. This is the current Malagasy record.

At the 1972 Summer Olympics he reached the semi-final of the 100 metres and was eliminated in the heats with the Madagascar 4 x 100 metres relay team.

In 1975 he became the first of only two men to date to have won the Stawell Gift, Australia's most prestigious professional foot race, off the scratch mark. The race is run over 120 metres, but entrants are handicapped according to their competitive form, and most start at a mark a few metres ahead of the start line.

Ravelomanantsoa died on 27 September 2016, aged 73, in Lyon.

References

External links

Hall of Fame at Westmont College
1975 Stawell Gift final

1943 births
2016 deaths
Malagasy male sprinters
Athletes (track and field) at the 1964 Summer Olympics
Athletes (track and field) at the 1968 Summer Olympics
Athletes (track and field) at the 1972 Summer Olympics
Olympic athletes of Madagascar
Stawell Gift winners
People from Antananarivo
Westmont College alumni
African Games bronze medalists for Madagascar
African Games medalists in athletics (track and field)
Universiade medalists in athletics (track and field)
Athletes (track and field) at the 1965 All-Africa Games
Universiade medalists for Madagascar
USA Indoor Track and Field Championships winners
Medalists at the 1970 Summer Universiade